Vè (chữ Nôm: 噅) or Đồng dao (chữ Hán: 童謠) is a poetic and song form for children, most typical of Vietnam.

History

It is used primarily in satirical poems, and is also performed with the accompaniment of percussion instruments. It is often used to make humorous observations about a certain topic, as a form of social criticism.

A vè poem or song consists of rhyming couplets, in which the final syllable of every other row rhymes with the final syllable in the next row. The rhyme scheme is therefore :

xxxa
xxxb
xxxb
xxxc
xxxc
xxxd
etc.

The following is an example of vè, in which the words that rhyme are highlighted. Some examples:

Culture
Song Defense of the fortress (Trấn thủ lưu đồn) by oral folks :
Paragraph 1 : Time of departure

Paragraph 2 : Time of quarter

Song Defense of the fortress by Phạm Duy :

See also
Vietnamese literature

References

Books
Dương Quảng Hàm (1980?). Văn-học Việt-Nam. Glendale, Ca.: Dainam.
An Nam phong tục sách, Mai Viên Đoàn Triển, Nhà xuất bản Hà Nội 2008
Các khía cạnh văn hoá Việt Nam, Nguyễn Thị Thanh Bình - Dana Healy, Nhà xuất bản Thế giới 2006
Cơ sở văn hóa Việt Nam, Trần Quốc Vượng (chủ biên), Nhà xuất bản Giáo dục 2009
Lễ hội Việt Nam, Vũ Ngọc Khánh, Nhà xuất bản Thanh Niên 2008
Một hướng tiếp cận văn hóa Việt Nam, Hồ Liên, Nhà xuất bản Văn Học 2008
Người Việt Đất Việt, Toan Ánh - Cửu Long Giang, Nhà xuất bản Văn Học 2003
Nói về miền Nam, Cá tính miền Nam, Thuần phong mỹ tục Việt Nam, Sơn Nam, Nhà xuất bản Trẻ 2009
Việt Nam phong tục, Phan Kế Bính, Nhà xuất bản Văn Học 2005
Việt Nam văn hóa sử cương, Đào Duy Anh, Nhà xuất bản Văn hóa Thông tin 2003
Việt Nam văn minh sử cương, Lê Văn Siêu, Nhà xuất bản Thanh Niên 2004

Sites
Viettouch. This site is dedicated to the promotion of Vietnamese history and culture; see reviews of the site.
Culture of Vietnam encyclopedia
Việt-Học Thư-Quán - Institute of Vietnamese Studies - Viện Việt Học Many pdfs of Vietnamese literature books
https://web.archive.org/web/20121112121058/http://thanglong.ece.jhu.edu/vhvn.html
Translating Vietnamese poetry
Vietnamese Poetry Collection

Vietnamese literary genres